The foxy lark or Abyssinian lark (Calendulauda alopex) is a species of lark in the family Alaudidae. It is found in east-central Africa.

Taxonomy and systematics
Formerly, the foxy lark was classified as belonging to the genus Mirafra until moved to Calendulauda in 2009. Not all authorities recognize this re-classification. Alternate names for the foxy lark include the Abyssinian fawn-colored lark and Somali fawn-coloured bush lark. Clements has merged this bird with the fawn-colored lark.

Subspecies 
Two subspecies are recognized: 
 Masai fawn-coloured lark or Hewitt's clapper lark (C. a. intercedens) - (Reichenow, 1895): Originally described as a separate species in the genus Mirafra. Found from eastern and southern Ethiopia and western Somalia to eastern Uganda, Kenya and northern Tanzania. 
 C. a. alopex - (Sharpe, 1890): Found in extreme eastern Ethiopia and northern Somalia

Distribution and habitat 
The foxy lark has a large range, with an estimated global extent of occurrence of 100,000-1,000,000 km2, where it is found in dense, thorny scrubland.

References

External links 

Abyssinian lark song - xeno-canto

foxy lark
Birds of East Africa
foxy lark
foxy lark
Taxonomy articles created by Polbot